Ransford Osei (born 5 December 1990) is a Ghanaian former professional footballer, who played as a striker for Lithuanian club Palanga.

Club career

Early career 
Osei began his career at his homeland club Kessben FC now Medeama Sporting Club, On 28 February 2008, he was set to join Polish club Legia Warsaw on a six-month loan contract which gave the Polish club the option to buy the player during that time. Due to a work permit issue, the transfer was blocked by FIFA. Osei stayed in Kessben.

Maccabi Haifa 
In 2008, he joined Israel-based side Maccabi Haifa on loan. He subsequently signed a three-year contract of employment.

Twente
In July 2009, Osei joined Dutch side FC Twente on a year-long loan deal.

Granada
In August 2010, Granada CF announced that they had signed Osei on loan, and that he would join up with their second team Granada B.

Bloemfontein Celtic
After a short trial period, South African club Bloemfontein Celtic gave Ransford Osei a six-month contract in January 2012.

Asante Kotoko
In July 2012, Osei signed for 22-time champions of Ghana, and two times champions of Africa, Asante Kotoko. In September 2013, he turned down a contract renewal by Asante Kotoko, before being left out of Asante Kotoko's 2014 CAF Champions League's squad in the December. He won the Ghana Premier League on two occasions whilst playing for the Kumasi-based club.

Polokwane City
In January 2015, Osei signed for South African Premier Soccer League side Polokwane City on a three-year contract. After managing just three substitute appearances due to injury, he was released by Polokwane City prior to the start of the 2015–16 season.

RoPS
After going on trial with Kazakhstan Premier League side FC Shakhter Karagandy at the beginning of February, Osei played for RoPS in their Finnish League Cup match against PS Kemi Kings on 16 February. Five days later, 21 February, Osei signed a two-year contract with RoPS. He was later loaned to Santa Claus.

International career

2007 African Under-17 Championship
He featured for Ghana at the U-17 level in 2007. He played a key role in the Black Starlets' journey to placing 3rd at the 2007 African U-17 Championship. At the end of the tournament he was award Silver Boot for scoring the 2nd highest number of goals.

2007 FIFA U-17 World Cup
On 20 August, he found the net twice in the 12 and 44th minute against Trinidad and Tobago in Ghana's 4–1 win during their first group game. Osei went on to score two more goals against Germany and Colombia, to take Ghana into the last sixteen of the FIFA U-17 World Cup, where they met and defeated favorites Brazil despite playing the entire second half with only ten men

On 1 September, Osei set up the first goal and scored the second as the Ghanaians beat Peru 2–0 to take them into the U-17 semi-final match against Spain.

Osei finished the U-17 World Cup with the Adidas Silver Shoe as the competitions second highest goalscorer, coming second by one goal to Macauley Chrisantus of Nigeria. He scored his sixth and final goal of the Tournament came in the third place play-off in the tournament as Ghana lost 2–1 to Germany.

2009 FIFA U-20 World Cup
Osei scored in his first game against Uzbekistan in the 2009 FIFA U-20 World Cup one goal and played 90 minutes. He scored also another goal in his second game against England national under-20 football team and played 85 minutes.

Senior internationals
On 13 November 2007, three weeks before his 17th birthday, he received his first senior International call-up from Ghana coach Claude Le Roy for a FIFA International friendly match against Togo at the Ohene Djan Stadium in Accra, Ghana, on 18 November 2007 after scoring a superb hat-trick against Togo's U17 team in a Junior International friendly at the same venue on Sunday 11 November 2007. He was selected among the nations 2010 Africa Cup of Nations squad even though he didn't appear in any of the matches. Ghana won silver in that tournament.

Style of play 
A Striker described by FIFA.com as "an opportunistic goal machine" with superb pace and movement, young free-scoring sensation Osei was recognized by World Soccer Magazine as one of the 50 Most Exciting Teenagers on the Planet in their November 2007 Issue.

When it comes to designing the perfect striker, he has one particular model in mind. " I'd love to have Patrick Kluivert's heading ability, the speed and ball control of Samuel Eto'o and the finishing skills of Thierry Henry. I've got a few videos of him that I watch very closely". "Whenever I miss chances I can't sleep at night," Osei, the adidas Silver Shoe winner at the 2007 U-17 World Cup, tells FIFA.com. " I go through them over and over again in my mind, replaying them until I find the exact movement I should have made out on the pitch. When I'm sure I've learned my lesson I relax a little bit, but even then I know I'm not going to sleep that well."

Career statistics

Club

International

Honours
Maccabi Haifa
 Israeli Premier League: 2008–09

Asante Kotoko
 Ghana Premier League: 2012–13, 2013–14
 Ghana Super Cup: 2012–13
Ghana U-20
 FIFA U-20 World Cup: 2009
 African Youth Championship: 2009
Individual
 2009 African Youth Championship – (Golden Boot)
 2007 African Under-17 Championship – (Golden Boot)
 2007 FIFA U-17 World Cup – (Silver Boot)

References

External links
 

1990 births
Living people
Ghanaian footballers
Ghana under-20 international footballers
2010 Africa Cup of Nations players
Association football forwards
S.C. Adelaide players
Medeama SC players
Berekum Chelsea F.C. players
Club Recreativo Granada players
Maccabi Haifa F.C. players
FC Twente players
Bloemfontein Celtic F.C. players
Asante Kotoko S.C. players
Ghana Premier League players
Ghanaian expatriate footballers
Expatriate footballers in Israel
Expatriate footballers in the Netherlands
Expatriate footballers in Spain
Ghanaian expatriate sportspeople in Spain
Ghanaian expatriate sportspeople in the Netherlands
Footballers from Kumasi
FC Santa Claus players
Ghana international footballers